Kapnochori ("tobacco village") is a village and a community of the Kozani municipality. Before the 2011 local government reform it was part of the municipality of Ellispontos, of which it was a municipal district. The 2011 census recorded 301 inhabitants in the village and 331 in the respective community.

Administrative division
The community of Kapnochori consists of three separate settlements:
Anatoliko (population 28)
Kapnochori (population 301)
Skafi (population 2)
The aforementioned populations are as of 2011.

References

Populated places in Kozani (regional unit)